Davor Lasić (born 15 November 1966) is a Croatian former footballer who played as a defender.
He is famous for his golden goal scored in the 1998–99 Croatian Football Cup final which earned Osijek the title.
In 2010 he briefly coached Istra 1961 in replacement of Robert Jarni.

Honours

Player

Osijek
Croatian Cup: 1998–99

References

External links
 
 

1966 births
Living people
People from Brinje
Association football defenders
Yugoslav footballers
Croatian footballers
NK Istra 1961 players
HNK Orijent players
NK Osijek players
Croatian football managers
NK Istra 1961 managers